Li Andong (born July 1946) is a retired general in the People's Liberation Army of China. He was a member of the 16th Central Committee of the Chinese Communist Party and an alternate member of the 17th Central Committee of the Chinese Communist Party.

Biography
Li was born in Xi'an, Shaanxi, in July 1946. He enlisted in the People's Liberation Army (PLA) in August 1965. He graduated from Harbin Military Academy of Engineering (now National University of Defense Technology), majoring in aviation. After university in 1970, he was despatched to the PLA Air Force. He joined the Chinese Communist Party (CCP) in December 1973. He was transferred to the People's Liberation Army General Staff Department in June 1985, becoming head of its Equipment Division in February 1993. In August 1998, he became assistant head of the People's Liberation Army General Armaments Department, rising to deputy head in December 2000.

He was promoted to the rank of major general (shaojiang) in July 1995, lieutenant general (zhongjiang) in July 2002, and general (shangjiang) in July 2010.

Awards
31 August 2010   Order of Bohdan Khmelnytsky, 3rd Class (Ukraine)

References

1946 births
Living people
People from Xi'an
National University of Defense Technology alumni
People's Liberation Army generals from Shaanxi
People's Republic of China politicians from Shaanxi
Chinese Communist Party politicians from Shaanxi
Members of the 16th Central Committee of the Chinese Communist Party
Alternate members of the 17th Central Committee of the Chinese Communist Party
Recipients of the Order of Bohdan Khmelnytsky, 3rd class